Liu Sifen (born January 1944) is a Chinese novelist and painter who was the president of Guangdong Literature and Art Association.

Biography
Liu was born in Wuzhou, Guangxi in January 1944. In 1946, his family moved to British Hong Kong. After the founding of the PRC, his family settled in Guangzhou, Guangdong in 1951.

Liu graduated from Guangzhou First School in 1962, he entered Sun Yat-Sen University, majoring in Chinese language.

In 1966, Mao Zedong launched the Cultural Revolution, Liu worked in Taishan County as a farmer, at the same time, he studied oil painting and gouache under Hao Jiaxian.

In 1970, Liu was transferred from Taishan County to Ding'an County, Hainan.

In 1975, Liu returned to Guangzhou, he worked in Guangdong Provincial Party Committee Propaganda Department, and he began to research Chinese Culture.

Liu started to write novel White Gate Willow in 1984.

In 1989, Liu studied Chinese painting.

In 1995, Liu was appointed the director of Guangdong Artists Association and the president of Guangdong Literature and Art Association.

In 2003, Liu served as the president of Guangdong Painting Academy. At the same year, Liu joined the Chinese Calligraphy Association.

Works

Novel
 White Gate Willow

Awards
 White Gate Willow – 4th Mao Dun Literature Prize (1997)

References

1944 births
People from Wuzhou
Sun Yat-sen University alumni
Writers from Guangxi
Living people
Mao Dun Literature Prize laureates
Chinese male novelists